Bonny Sengupta (Born Anupriyo Sengupta; 10 August 1990) is an Indian Bengali film actor. His first two films, Borbaad and Parbona Ami Chartey Tokey, were directed by Raj Chakraborty. His father is Anup Sengupta and his mother Piya Sengupta. He is the grandson of actor-director Sukhen Das.

Bonny had earlier assisted director Raj Chakraborty on Yoddha: The Warrior before his career as an actor.

Filmography

References

External links 
 

Indian male film actors
Living people
Place of birth missing (living people)
Male actors from Kolkata
21st-century Indian male actors
1991 births
Bharatiya Janata Party politicians from West Bengal